"Every Single Day" is the second single released by former Australian Idol contestant, Rob Mills. "Every Single Day" was released in August 2004 and peaked at number #24 on the Australian ARIA Singles Chart.

Track listing
 "Every Single Day" - 3:37
 "All Right Now" (Live At 001) - 4:14
 "Dirty Girl" - 3:55

Charts

References

2004 singles
2004 songs
Sony BMG singles
Songs written by Phil Buckle